Phoebe Monahan (born 3 July 1993) is an Australian rules footballer who plays for Brisbane in the AFL Women's (AFLW) competition. She has previously played for Greater Western Sydney and Richmond.

Early life and state-league football
Monahan hails from the regional Victorian city of Geelong, where she played school football with Clonard College. At age 18, Monahan began playing with the North Geelong Football Club in the Victorian Women's Football League where she remained for three seasons.

After moving to Sydney to become a sapper in the Australian Defence Force, Monahan took up playing matches with the Army team in intra-defence force matches and then later played for the UNSW-Eastern Suburbs Stingrays in the state-league level AFL Sydney Women's Premier League in 2016. She won premierships there in both 2016 and 2017, and in 2017 she placed third in the league best and fairest award while playing as a midfielder.

AFL Women's career

Greater Western Sydney
Monahan was drafted by Greater Western Sydney with the club's fourth selection and the thirty-ninth pick overall in the 2017 AFL Women's draft.

She spent the off-season playing matches for the ADF representative side, as well as with Richmond in the VFL Women's where she finished third in the club's best and fairest count. Following that, Monahan returned to the Giants for the 2019 AFL Women's season and played a further four matches, taking her two-year tally to 10.

Richmond
In the 2019 expansion period, Monahan signed a free-agency deal to join Richmond's newly formed AFLW team.

Prior to the start of the season, Monahan was appointed to the club's four person leadership group as co-deputy vice captain.

In June 2021, Monahan was delisted by Richmond along with Alana Woodward.

Brisbane
A fortnight after being delisted by Richmond, Monahan joined Brisbane as a delisted free agent.

Statistics
Statistics are correct to the end of the 2021 season.

|- style="background-color: #eaeaea"
! scope="row" style="text-align:center" | 2018
|style="text-align:center;"|
| 28 || 6 || 0 || 0 || 38 || 9 || 47 || 4 || 17 || 0.0 || 0.0 || 6.3 || 1.5 || 7.8 || 0.7 || 2.8
|- 
! scope="row" style="text-align:center" | 2019
|style="text-align:center;"|
| 28 || 4 || 0 || 0 || 15 || 13 || 28 || 0 || 8 || 0.0 || 0.0 || 3.8 || 3.3 || 7.0 || 0.0 || 2.0
|- style="background-color: #eaeaea"
! scope="row" style="text-align:center" | 2020
|style="text-align:center;"|
| 2 || 6 || 0 || 1 || 84 || 19 || 103 || 16 || 17 || 0.0 || 0.2 || 14.0 || 3.2 || 17.2 || 2.7 || 2.8
|- 
! scope="row" style="text-align:center" | 2021
|style="text-align:center;"|
| 2 || 6 || 0 || 0 || 40 || 13 || 53 || 11 || 10 || 0.0 || 0.0 || 6.7 || 2.2 || 8.8 || 1.8 || 1.7
|-
|- class="sortbottom"
! colspan=3| Career
! 22
! 0
! 1
! 177
! 54
! 231
! 31
! 52
! 0.0
! 0.0
! 8.0
! 2.5
! 10.5
! 1.4
! 2.4
|}

Personal life
Outside of football, Monahan works as a carpenter in the Australian Army.

References

External links

1993 births
Living people
Greater Western Sydney Giants (AFLW) players
Australian rules footballers from Victoria (Australia)
Richmond Football Club (AFLW) players
Brisbane Lions (AFLW) players